Moacyr Claudino Pinto da Silva (born 18 May 1936 in São Paulo), nicknamed Moacir or Moacyr, is a Brazilian former footballer.

Early life
Son of railman, Moacir ran away from home and lived for more than ten years in an orphanage in Osasco.

Recommended by a friend, he went to CR Flamengo to be part of the youth teams, where he started to live in the club dorms.

He still resides in Guayaquil City, where he raised his family.

Career

After his time as a junior player, he highlighted and was select to be part of the princpal team of CR Flamengo.

Later in his career, he also played for Flamengo, River Plate of Argentina, Peñarol of Uruguay, and Everest and Barcelona of Ecuador.

International

He earned 6 caps and scored 2 goals for the Brazil national football team. He was part of the 1958 FIFA World Cup winning squad, but he did not play any matches during the tournament, mainly because he was reserve for one the most important brazilian players of all time Valdir Pereira.

References

1936 births
Living people
Brazilian footballers
Brazil international footballers
1958 FIFA World Cup players
FIFA World Cup-winning players
Peñarol players
Club Atlético River Plate footballers
Barcelona S.C. footballers
CR Flamengo footballers
Argentine Primera División players
Brazilian expatriate footballers
Expatriate footballers in Argentina
Expatriate footballers in Ecuador
Expatriate footballers in Uruguay
Brazilian expatriate sportspeople in Argentina
Brazilian expatriate sportspeople in Ecuador
Brazilian expatriate sportspeople in Uruguay
Association football forwards
Association football midfielders
Footballers from São Paulo